George Sherman Lane (28 September 1902 in Wayne County, Iowa – 18 September 1981 in Chapel Hill, North Carolina) was an American linguist. His research focus was the Tocharian language.

Life 
Lane began his studies in 1922 at the University of Iowa, where he studied under Henning Larsen and received his first award, the Early English Text Society Prize. In 1926, he graduated first of his class, and in 1927 obtained a Master of Arts in English. This was followed by studies in Reykjavík, where he learned Sanskrit, as well as in Paris, where he studied under Meillet, Vendryes and Benveniste. At the University of Chicago he collaborated with Carl Darling Buck on the latter's Dictionary of selected synonyms in the principal Indo-European languages. After his dissertation, he joined the University of North Carolina in Chapel Hill, where he conducted further research on the Tocharian language, particularly the grammar of Tocharian B. In 1952, he was admitted to the American Academy of Arts and Sciences.

His son, Eugene N. Lane (1936–2007), became a professor in classical philology.

Selected works 
 Words for clothing in the principal Indo-European languages. Chicago, 1930.
 Vocabulary to the Tocharian Puṇyavantajātaka. Baltimore, 1948.
 Studies in Kuchean grammar. Baltimore, 1952.

Further reading 
 Walter W. Arndt: Studies in Historical Linguistics in Honor of George Sherman Lane. Chapel Hill 1967

References 

American philologists
1902 births
1981 deaths
Linguists of Indo-European languages
University of Chicago alumni
University of Iowa alumni
University of North Carolina at Chapel Hill faculty
20th-century philologists
Linguists of Tocharian languages